Rio Akisada (秋定 里穂 Akisada Rio, born 8 September 1982 in Tokyo, Japan) is a Japanese actress.

External links

JMDb Profile (in Japanese)
Profile at Breath Inc. (in Japanese)

1982 births
Living people
21st-century Japanese actresses
People from Tokyo